Procopius Anthemius (fl. 469–515 AD) was a politician of the Eastern Roman Empire, son of Western Roman Emperor Anthemius.  After the death of the Eastern Roman Emperor Leo I, Procopius sided with his brother Marcianus's attempt to overthrow Zeno.  When Marcianus's rebellion failed, Procopius fled to Thrace and then to Rome, returning to Constatinople after the death of Zeno and accession of Anastasius I.  After his return to Constantinople, he was consul in 515.

Biography 

Procopius was the son of Anthemius and of Marcia Euphemia, daughter of the Eastern Roman Emperor. His brothers were Anthemiolus, Marcianus and Romulus; he also had a sister, Alypia.

He lived at Constantinople, at Eastern Emperor Leo I's court, while his father later ruled the Western Roman Empire (467-472), unsuccessfully trying to restore Roman power in the Western provinces beyond Italy and Gaul. During this time, his brother Anthemiolus died while leading an attack against the Visigoths (in 471) and his sister Alypia married Ricimer, the powerful magister militum of barbarian origin.

In 474, Leo died. He had left no sons and two daughters, the elder Ariadne, born before Leo was raised to the throne and married to the Isaurian general Zeno, and the younger Leontia, born when Leo was already emperor and married to Procopius' brother, Marcian.

The people of Constantinople despised the Isaurians, whom they considered barbarians; furthermore, Leontia's status as "porphyrogenita" gave her some sort of precedence to the throne, according to the faction that opposed Zeno. For this reason Marcian tried to overthrow Zeno. With the help of Procopius and Romulus, he gathered in Constantinople troops composed of both citizens and foreigners in the house of a Caesarius, south of the Forum of Theodosius, and from there they marched at the same time on the imperial palace and on the house of Illus, an Isaurian general who supported Zeno. The emperor almost fell into the hands of the rebels, who, during the day, overwhelmed the imperial troops, who were also attacked by citizens from the roofs of their houses. During the night, however, Illus succeeded in moving an Isaurian unit quartered in nearby Chalcedonia into Constantinople and in corrupting Marcian's soldiers, who allowed Zeno to flee. On the following morning Marcian, understanding that his situation was desperate and that reinforcements under the Gothic general Theodoric Strabo would not arrive in time, took refuge in the church of the Holy Apostles, but was then arrested with his brothers. 

They were sent to Caesarea in Cappadocia. With the help of some monks, they tried to escape, but Marcian failed, while Procopius fled to Theodoric Strabo in Thrace, – where the latter refused to hand him to Zeno – and then to Rome.

Later Procopius returned to Constantinople, during the reign of Anastasius I (491-518). Empress Ariadne asked Anastasius, whom she had married after Zeno's death, to appoint Procopius praetorian prefect. Anastasius refused, saying that the office required more learning than Procopius had. Nonetheless, Procopius was appointed consul for 515.

Procopius might be the Anthemius who was married to Herais and father of a Zeno betrothed to a nephew of Emperor Zeno; this Anthemius was probably a patricius.

Notes

Bibliography 
 Jones, Arnold Hugh Martin, John Robert Martindale, John Morris, "Procopius Anthemius 9", Prosopography of the Later Roman Empire, Volume 2, Cambridge University Press, 1980, p. 99.
 Mathisen, Ralph W., "Anthemius (12 April 467 - 11 July 472 A.D.)", De Imperatoribus Romanis

6th-century deaths
5th-century Byzantine people
6th-century Byzantine people
6th-century Roman consuls
Ancient rebels
Byzantine rebels
Imperial Roman consuls
House of Leo
Theodosian dynasty
Sons of Roman emperors